Parliamentary elections were held in Haiti on 14 June 1964, alongside a constitutional referendum. The National Unity Party of President François Duvalier was the sole legal party at the time, with all other parties having been banned the previous year.

References

Elections in Haiti
Haiti
1964 in Haiti
One-party elections
Election and referendum articles with incomplete results